Kilruane MacDonaghs GAA is a Tipperary GAA club which is located in County Tipperary, Ireland. Both hurling and Gaelic football are played in the "North-Tipperary" divisional competitions. The club is centred on the villages of Kilruane, Ardcroney and Cloughjordan. The club was founded in 1937 and is named after Thomas MacDonagh, a signatory of the 1916 Proclamation who was born and lived in Cloughjordan. The clubhouse and playing field are located in Cloughjordan.

The finest day in the club's history was in 1986 when it won the Senior Hurling Club All-Ireland title, defeating Buffers Alley of Wexford GAA in the final by 1-15 to 2-10.

The club incorporates many of clubs that existed in the parishes at the time. A forerunner to the MacDonaghs club was the famous De Wets formed in 1900.

On 30 October 2022, Kilruane MacDonaghs defeated Kiladangan 2-20 to 1-16 in the 2022 Tipperary Senior Hurling Championship final after a replay to win their first title since 1985.

Honours
 All-Ireland Senior Club Hurling Championship: 1
1986
Munster Senior Club Hurling Championship: 1
1985
Tipperary Senior Club Hurling Championship: (6) 1902 (De Wets), 1977, 1978, 1979, 1985, 2022
Tipperary Senior Club Football Championship: 1
1975
 North Tipperary Senior Hurling Championship 19 
1901 , 1902, 1903, 1904, 1906, 1907, 1908 (De Wets),
1940, 1944, 1959, 1965, 1977, 1978, 1979, 1985, 1986, 1987, 1990, 2018
 North Tipperary Senior Football Championship 6
 1972, 1976, 1977, 1978, 1979, 1981
 Tipperary Intermediate Hurling Championship 2
 1978, 2003
 Munster Intermediate Club Hurling Championship Runners-up
 2003
 North Tipperary Intermediate Hurling Championship 1
 1978
 Tipperary Junior A Hurling Championship 2
 1960,1985
 North Tipperary Junior A Hurling Championship 10
  1913 (De Wets), 1950, 1954, 1956, 1960, 1964, 1975, 1985, 1995, 1998
 Tipperary Junior B Football Championship 1 2022
 Tipperary Junior B Hurling Championship 1
 2004
 North Tipperary Junior B Hurling League 1
 2004
 North Tipperary Junior B Football Championship 1 ** 2022
 Tipperary Under-21 A Football Championship 1 ** 1978
 North Tipperary Under-21 A Football Championship 6
 1970, 1973, 1974, 1975, 1976, 1978
 North Tipperary Under-21 B Football Championship 3
 1997, 1998, 2004
 North Tipperary Under-21 C Football Championship 1
 2002
 Tipperary Under-21 A Hurling Championship 7
 1973, 1974, 1975, 1976, 2006, 2007, 2010
 North Tipperary Under-21 A Hurling Championship 12
 1972, 1973, 1974, 1975, 1976, 1978, 2006, 2007, 2009, 2010, 2012, 2013
 Tipperary Under-21 B Hurling Championship 1
 1993
 North Tipperary Under-21 B Hurling Championship 1
 1993
  Tipperary Under-21 C Hurling Championship 1
 2002
 North Tipperary Under-21 C Hurling Championship 1
 2002
 Tipperary Minor B Football Championship 
1 2017
  North Tipperary Minor A Football Championship 3
 1970, 1972, 1984 
  North Tipperary Minor B Football Championship 2
 2008, 2017
  Tipperary Minor A Hurling Championship 2
 1972, 2005
  North Tipperary Minor A Hurling Championship 8
 1952, 1964, 1971, 1972, 1973, 2004, 2005, 2006 
  North Tipperary Minor B Hurling Championship''' 2
 1975, 2018

Notable players
 Dinny Cahill
 Len Gaynor
 Brian Gaynor, Tipperary hurler 1994-97
 Jimmy Gibson
 Seamus Gibson
 Séamus Hennessy
 Tom Moloughney, Tipperary hurler 1960-63, All Ireland winner 1961 and 1962
 Mark O'Leary
 Brian O'Meara
 Niall O'Meara
 Sean (Johnny) O'Meara
 Éamonn O'Shea

References

External links
Kilruane MacDonagh's GAA Club website

Hurling clubs in County Tipperary
Gaelic games clubs in County Tipperary
Gaelic football clubs in County Tipperary
Cloughjordan